Conoco Inc. was an American oil and gas company that operated from 1875 until 2002, when it merged with Phillips Petroleum to form ConocoPhillips. Founded by Isaac Elder Blake in 1875 as the "Continental Oil and Transportation Company". Currently the name Conoco is a brand of gasoline and service station in the United States which belongs to Phillips 66 following the spin-off of ConocoPhillips' downstream assets in May 2012.

History 
The "Continental Oil and Transportation Company" was founded by Isaac Elder Blake in 1875. Based in Ogden, Utah, the company distributed oil, kerosene, benzene, and other products in the western United States. Continental Oil Company was acquired by Standard Oil Company in 1884, and was subsequently spun off during the Standard Oil divestiture in 1911. 

The main office was later moved to Ponca City, Oklahoma, when in 1929, Marland Oil Company (founded by exploration pioneer E. W. Marland) acquired the Continental Oil Company. Marland Oil acquired the assets (subject to liabilities) of Continental Oil Company for a consideration of 2,317,266 shares of stock. The merged company took the more recognizable Continental name along with the Conoco brand. However, it adopted Marland’s red triangle logo, which it retained until 1970 the now-familiar capsule logo was adopted.

Dan Moran, who succeeded Marland founder E. W. Marland as president of Marland Oil in 1928, became the first president of the merged Conoco. Moran ran Conoco for twenty years, seeing the company through challenges of the great depression, and retiring in 1947. The company ran into early trouble when, shortly after acquisition, it was hit by the Great Crash of October 1929. Conoco became a key supplier to the United States government during World War II.

Under the leadership of Leonard F. McCollum, Conoco grew from a regional company to a global corporation in the years after World War II. Another rough patch for the company came during the 1970s oil crisis, from which it did not recover until 1981, when Conoco became a subsidiary of former rival DuPont.

In 1981, cash rich and wanting to diversify, Seagram Company Ltd. engineered a takeover of Conoco. Although Seagram acquired a 32.2% stake in Conoco, DuPont was brought in as a white knight by the oil company and entered the bidding war. Mobil Corporation, the nation's second-largest oil company at the time, also joined the bid, and borrowed $5 billion to bid for Cocono. In the end, Seagram and Mobil lost out in the Conoco bidding war. In exchange for its stake in Conoco Inc, Seagram became a 24.3% owner of DuPont.  By 1995, Seagram was DuPont's largest single shareholder with four seats on the board of directors.

In 1998, DuPont sold 30% of Conoco, and in 1999, DuPont sold the remaining 70% stake it holds in Conoco Inc. When the independent Conoco went public in October 1998, under a retooled name, Continental Oil Company, it resulted in the largest IPO in history. In 2001, Conoco announced it has agreed to buy Gulf Canada for C$6.7 billion ($4.3 billion). Conoco merged with Phillips Petroleum in 2002 to form ConocoPhillips.

Corporate headquarters 
Before the merger, Conoco had its headquarters in what is now the current ConocoPhillips headquarters in the Energy Corridor of Houston; the complex was formerly known as the Conoco Center.

The headquarters of Conoco moved to Houston, in 1949. In 1965, the headquarters moved to Manhattan, New York City. In 1972, the headquarters moved to Stamford, Connecticut; in Stamford Conoco occupied space in the three story High Ridge Park complex. In 1982, DuPont announced that Conoco's headquarters would move from Stamford to Wilmington, Delaware. The move occurred in 1982. Edward G. Jefferson, the chairperson of DuPont, said that the headquarters relocation was to bring the head workforces of DuPont and Conoco together. DuPont also announced that it was closing the Conoco offices in Stamford; the lease in the Stamford complex was originally scheduled to expire in 1992.

Conoco-Iran deal 
In 1995, Conoco Inc. was awarded a contract by Iran to develop a huge offshore oilfield in the Persian Gulf. It was the first energy agreement involving Iran and the United States since Washington severed relations with Tehran in 1980. The contract was signed after three years of negotiations. However, the company dropped the plan after the White House announced that President Bill Clinton would issue a directive blocking all such transactions on grounds of national security.

Museum 
The official Conoco museum was completed in 2007 and is located in Ponca City, Oklahoma.

Conoco brand 

Along with sister brands, Phillips 66, and 76, "Conoco" (properly pronounced CON-oco, not Co-NO-co or CO-noco), is a major American brand of oil and gas station that has been owned by Phillips 66 since 2012 and was originally the brand used by its originator, Conoco Inc., from 1875 to its merger with Phillips Petroleum in 2002. Although the Conoco brand can be used in any state in which the Phillips 66 Company operates, it is very rare to see the Conoco brand in California and Oregon where the 76 brand predominates.

Bibliography

References

External links

 Official website
  The Conoco-Somalia Declassification Project at College of DuPage

Defunct oil companies of the United States
ConocoPhillips
Automotive fuel retailers
Gas stations in the United States
Chemical companies of the United States
Non-renewable resource companies established in 1875
Companies disestablished in 2002
1875 establishments in Utah Territory
2002 disestablishments in Texas
Companies based in Ogden, Utah
Companies based in Houston
Defunct companies based in Oklahoma
Defunct companies based in Texas
Defunct companies based in Utah
Kay County, Oklahoma
Phillips 66